Lady Jean Stewart (also known as Jane Stuart; c. 1533 – 7 January 1587/88), was an illegitimate daughter of King James V of Scotland by his mistress, Elizabeth Bethune (sometimes spelled Betoun or Beaton).

Childhood 
Jean was born between 1528 and 1537. Her mother Elizabeth was the daughter of Sir John Bethune, 2nd of Creich, and Janet Hay. Elizabeth Bethune was first married to John Stewart, 4th Lord Innermeath, by whom she had two sons: James Stewart, later 5th Lord Innermeath and the poet John Stewart of Baldynneis. She married, secondly, James Gray, son of Patrick Gray, 4th Lord Gray.

As an infant, Lady Jean Stewart was brought up in the household of Mary of Guise, the Queen of Scotland as wife of King James V, and then briefly in the nursery of the Queen's eldest son, Prince James, the Duke of Rothesay, her legitimate half-brother. The Scottish treasurer's accounts record purchases for the infant Lady Jean. In September 1538, she was given a canopy made with 27 ells of red, yellow, and green cloth.

By March 1539, she was housed with her illegitimate half-brothers, "Lord James of Kelso and "Lord James of Saint Andrews", and had a black velvet and taffeta night gown lined with 'martrik' sable. In May 1539 she moved with the court from Stirling Castle to St Andrews. Her clothes were washed at Falkland Palace in April 1540. In July 1540, at St Andrews, she was sent seven hanks of coloured silks and cloth to embroider samplers, and in December 1540, she was given a missal and a matins book.

A list of payments for livery clothes for the household servants of the two Princes made in January 1541 includes two servants of his half-sister Lady Jean Stewart, Cristiane Baxstar and Thomas Stroupe.

Countess of Argyll
On 1 July 1553, Jean was married to Archibald Campbell, 5th Earl of Argyll. A wardrobe account of Mary of Guise includes clothes made as a gift for Lady Jean shortly before her wedding. Her cloak and skirt front had decorative bands of black satin. The couple would later divorce, on 23 June 1573, the reason being desertion.

During her married years, Jean lived for a time at Dunoon Castle, where her half-sister, Mary, Queen of Scots, visited her in 1563, and granted several charters during her stay there. The queen gave her a substantial allowance or pension of £150 Scots paid three times each year.

The Countess was at Holyrood Palace in December 1563. Mary, Queen of Scots, was tired after dancing on her twenty-first birthday and stayed in bed. The ambassador Thomas Randolph gave the Countess a diamond ring for Mary, a gift from Elizabeth I.

On the night of 9 March 1566, Jean Stewart, her mother Elizabeth, and her half-sister Queen Mary, witnessed the murder of Queen Mary's secretary, David Rizzio, at Holyroodhouse. At the baptism of Prince James at Stirling Castle in December 1566, she went in the chapel on behalf of the English ambassador, the Earl of Bedford, and was godmother. He gave her a valuable ruby ring.

After the "lang siege" of Edinburgh Castle in 1573, Lady Jean and her aunt Margaret Beaton were taken prisoner. She requested not be delivered to her husband, the Earl of Argyll. The English ambassador Henry Killigrew reported she was living comfortably at Regent Morton's board in June 1574, probably at Dalkeith Palace.

Later life
In May 1583 she had an illness described as a "spire of appoplexie" and considered finding a treatment in France, travelling through England.

She died at her lodging in the Canongate of Edinburgh which she rented from the goldsmith William Cokkie on 7 January 1588, attended by her servant and "special friend" Katrine Hamilton.

Lady Jean Stewart was buried next to her father, King James V, in the royal vault at Holyrood Palace in Edinburgh.

References 

1530s births
Burials at Holyrood Abbey
Court of James V of Scotland
Court of Mary, Queen of Scots
Jean Stewart
Year of birth uncertain
1588 deaths
16th-century Scottish women
16th-century Scottish people
Argyll
Daughters of kings